Denis Dmitrovich Istomin (born 12 January 1987) is a Russian professional ice hockey forward. He was drafted 117th overall in the 2005 NHL Entry Draft by the Chicago Blackhawks of the National Hockey League.

Career statistics

Regular season and playoffs

International

References

External links
 RussianProspects.com Denis Istomin's Profile

1987 births
Chicago Blackhawks draft picks
Living people
Metallurg Magnitogorsk players
Russian ice hockey right wingers
Torpedo Nizhny Novgorod players
Traktor Chelyabinsk players
HC Vityaz players